The Start-Preis is the highest Austrian award for young scientists.

It is awarded once per year by the Austrian Science Fund on behalf of the Austrian Ministry for Science.
It is endowed with up to 1.2 million Euro for a proposed research project for six years.

The recipients are selected by an international jury of experts. The same jury also selects the recipients of the related Wittgenstein-Preis.

Recipients 

 1996: Christian Koeberl, Ferenc Krausz, Ulrich Schmid, Peter Szmolyan, Karl Unterrainer, Harald Weinfurter, Gerhard J. Woeginger, Jakob Woisetschläger
 1997: Gerhard Holzapfel, Bernhard Palme, Michael Schmid
 1998: Peter Grabner, Gottfried Kirchengast, Rudolf Valenta, Gerhard Widmer
 1999: Christoph Marschner, Norbert Mauser, Otmar Scherzer, Thomas Schrefl, Christoph Spötl, Joseph Strauss
 2000: Thomas Brabec, Susanne Kalss, Dietrich Leibfried, Herbert Strobl, Bernhard Tilg
 2001: Markus Arndt, Michael Buchmeiser, Wolfgang Drexler, Wilfried Ellmeier, Clemens Sedmak
 2002: Wolfgang Heiss, Michael Jursa, Georg Schett, Dieter Schmalstieg, Joachim Schöberl
 2003: Georg Kresse, Hanns-Christoph Nägerl, Andreas Villunger
 2004: Thomas Bachner, Michael Kunzinger, Vassil Palankovski, Thomas Prohaska, Gerhard Schütz
 2005: Michael Hintermüller, Matthias Horn, Andrea Lusser, Michael Moser, Norbert Zimmermann
 2006: Hartmut Häffner, Norbert Polacek, Piet Schmidt, Josef Teichmann, Gerald Teschl
 2007: Kathrin Breuker, Thomas Bugnyar, Otfried Gühne, Bernhard Lamel, Thomas Lörting, Paul Mayrhofer, Sigrid Wadauer, Thomas Wallnig
 2008: Markus Aspelmeyer, Tom J. Battin, Massimo Fornasier, Daniel Grumiller, Alexander Kendl, Karel Riha, Kristin Tessmar-Raible, Christina Waldsich
 2009: Francesca Ferlaino, Ilse Fischer, Arthur Kaser, Manuel Kauers, Thorsten Schumm, David Teis
 2010: Julius Brennecke, Barbara Horejs, Barbara Kraus, Melanie Malzahn, Florian Schreck, Bojan Zagrovic
 2011: Peter Balazs, Agata Ciabattoni, Sebastian Diehl, Alwin Köhler, Thomas Müller, Peter Rabl,  Michael Sixt, Philip Walther
 2012: Julia Budka, Kaan Boztug, Alexander Dammermann, Jürgen Hauer, Michael Kirchler,  Sofia Kantorovich, Michael Kirchler, Franz Schuster
 2013: Stefan L. Ameres, Notburga Gierlinger, Clemens Heitzinger, Georgios Katsaros, David A. Keays, Ovidiu Paun, Thomas Pock, Paolo Sartori, Stefan Woltran
 2014: Bettina Bader, Mathias Beiglböck, Karin Schnass, René Thiemann, Sigrid Neuhauser, Alexander Grüneis, Markus Aichhorn, Manuel Schabus
 2015: Christoph Aistleitner, Ivona Brandić, Marcus Huber, Ben P. Lanyon, Gareth Parkinson, Rupert Seidl, Kristina Stöckl, Caroline Uhler
 2016: Christopher Campbell, Felix Höflmayer, Nikolai Kiesel, Tracy Northup, Michael Eichmair, Harald Grobner
 2017: Hannes Fellner, Claudine Kraft, Wolfgang Lechner, Vera Fischer, Miriam Unterlass, Andrea Pauli
 2018: Emanuela Bianchi, Josef Norbert Füssl, Philipp Haslinger, Oliver Hofmann, Robert R. Junker, Gina Elaine Moseley
 2019: Moritz Brehm, Christa Cuchiero, Bruno de Nicola, Christoph Gammer, José Luis Romero, Richard Wilhelm
 2020: Alice Auersperg, Elisa Davoli, Gemma De las Cuevas, Robert Ganian, Julia Lajta-Novak, Aleksandar Matkovic, Birgitta Schultze-Bernhardt

References

External links 
 START-Preis page of the Austrian Science Fund

Austrian science and technology awards